Milburn may refer to:

Places

United States
Milburn, Kentucky, an unincorporated community
Milburn, Nebraska, an unincorporated community
Milburn Township, Custer County, Nebraska
Milburn, Oklahoma, a town
Milburn, Texas, an unincorporated community 
Milburn, Utah, an unincorporated community 
Milburn, West Virginia, an unincorporated community

Elsewhere
Milburn, Cumbria, England, a village and civil parish
Milburn, New Zealand, a settlement
Milburn Bay, Trinity Island, Antarctica

As a name
Milburn (surname)
Milburn (given name)

Other uses
Milburn (band), a musical group
Milburn baronets, in the Baronetage of the United Kingdom
Milburn building, Toronto, Canada
Milburn Electric, a defunct electric car company active from 1915 to 1923
Milburn Schools, an American private school and charter school operator
Brooklyn Waterworks, also known as the Milburn Pumping Station, a former historic building in Freeport, Long Island, New York

See also
Millburn (disambiguation)